Melanmai Ponnusamy (1951 – 30 October 2017) was a Tamil writer from Tamil Nadu, India. He was born in Melanmarainadu village [மேலாண்மறை நாடு] in Virudhunagar District. He was a farmer by profession who also ran a grocery shop in his village. He was a Marxist by political orientation and a member of Communist Party of India (Marxist) (CPI-M). His first short story was published in 1972 in the literary journal Semmalar (lit. Red flower. CPI-M's literary publication). His works have since appeared in mainstream Tamil magazines like Ananda Vikatan and Kalki. He credited Soviet literature as a major influence in his writing style and choice of subjects. His works are set in rural Tamil Nadu and deal with the lives of peasants. As of 2009, he has written 23 short story collections, six novellas, six novels and an essay collection. He was awarded the 2008 Sahitya Akademi Award for his Tamil short story Minsarapoo (lit. the electric flower). He was also awarded the 2009 Makkal TV award for his contributions to Tamil Literature. He was a founder member and the general secretary of the Marxist writers' organisation - Tamil Nadu Progressive Writers Association (TNPWA). He was married to Ponnuthai and had three children.
He died on 30 October 2017.

References

1951 births
2017 deaths
Recipients of the Sahitya Akademi Award in Tamil
Writers from Tamil Nadu
Tamil writers
20th-century Indian essayists
People from Virudhunagar district
Indian Tamil people
Communist Party of India (Marxist) politicians from Tamil Nadu
Indian Marxist writers